Kelly Davis (born September 23, 1958) is a Canadian former professional ice hockey player who played in the World Hockey Association (WHA). Davis played 18 games with the Cincinnati Stingers during the 1978–79 WHA season. He was drafted in the sixth round of the 1978 NHL Amateur Draft by the New York Islanders.

References

External links

1958 births
Canadian ice hockey defencemen
Cincinnati Stingers players
Flin Flon Bombers players
Ice hockey people from Alberta
Indianapolis Checkers (CHL) players
Living people
New York Islanders draft picks
People from Grande Prairie
Philadelphia Firebirds (AHL) players
Springfield Indians players